Shane Churla (born June 24, 1965) is a Canadian former professional ice hockey player. He was drafted in the sixth round, 110th overall, by the Hartford Whalers in the 1985 NHL Entry Draft.  He is currently the director of amateur scouting for the Florida Panthers.

Playing career
After playing two seasons in the Western Hockey League with the Medicine Hat Tigers, Churla made his professional debut with the AHL's Binghamton Whalers in the 1985–86 season. He made his NHL debut with Hartford in the 1986–87 season, appearing in 20 games. After dressing for two more games with Hartford in the 1987–88 season, he was traded to the Calgary Flames in a multi-player deal.

During the 1988–89 season, the Flames traded Churla to the Minnesota North Stars. He was one of the players selected from the North Stars by the San Jose Sharks in the 1991 NHL Dispersal Draft; however, he was traded back to the North Stars only days later for Kelly Kisio.

Churla remained with the Stars franchise as it moved south to become the Dallas Stars. In the 1995–96 season, Churla moved from Dallas to the Los Angeles Kings, and then again to the New York Rangers. He retired as a Ranger after the 1996–97 season.

In his NHL career, Churla appeared in 488 games. He scored 26 goals and added 45 assists. He also appeared in 78 Stanley Cup playoff games, scoring five goals and tallying seven assists. Churla was considered a top enforcer in the NHL. He and Basil McRae were a formidable duo on the Minnesota North Stars at the end of the 1980s. He tallied 2,301 penalty minutes in his NHL career.

Churla is perhaps best remembered for receiving one of the most vicious elbows in NHL history during the 1994 Stanley Cup playoffs, courtesy of Pavel Bure. The elbow was dubbed by Don Cherry as "the mother of all elbows." He was once described by Hartford Whalers General Manager Emile Francis as "having the guts of a slaughter house".

Churla is currently (2022) the highest average penalty minute per game played record holder by any nhl player who played more than 100 games. (Source: records.nhl.com)

Post-retirement
After retirement, Churla continued working in the hockey industry. In 2005, he became a scout for the Dallas Stars, identifying and evaluating draft-eligible players. In 2013, he moved to the Montreal Canadiens in a similar capacity  and eventually became the director of amateur scouting. After 7 years in Montreal, Churla left to join the Florida Panthers as their director of amateur scouting.

Personal life
Churla is the cousin of former National Football League quarterback Mark Rypien.

Churla's younger brother, Russ, also played in the WHL for one season, but has since retired.

Career statistics

See also
List of NHL players with 2000 career penalty minutes

References

External links

1965 births
Living people
Arizona Coyotes scouts
Binghamton Whalers players
Calgary Flames players
Canadian expatriate ice hockey players in the United States
Canadian ice hockey right wingers
Dallas Stars players
Dallas Stars scouts
Hartford Whalers draft picks
Hartford Whalers players
Ice hockey people from British Columbia
Los Angeles Kings players
Medicine Hat Tigers players
Minnesota North Stars players
Montreal Canadiens scouts
New York Rangers players
People from Fernie, British Columbia
Salt Lake Golden Eagles (IHL) players